Holy Cross High School was a coeducational Catholic high school in Marine City, Michigan, United States.  It closed in 1989 but reopened the following year as Cardinal Mooney Catholic High School.

References

Defunct Catholic secondary schools in Michigan